Roy Fitzpatrick Banks (born February 19, 1965) is a former American football wide receiver who played for the Indianapolis Colts of the National Football League (NFL). He played college football at Eastern Illinois University.

References 

1965 births
Living people
American football wide receivers
Eastern Illinois Panthers football players
Indianapolis Colts players
Martin Luther King High School (Detroit) alumni